Yevhen Kucherenko (born 27 August 1999) is a Ukrainian professional footballer who plays as a goalkeeper for Kazakhstani side Aksu, on loan from Ukrainian Kolos Kovalivka.

Career
Kucherenko was born in Kyiv, Ukraine, and began his youth career at the Voshod and the FC Arsenal Kyiv academies.

In 2019 he was transferred to União Leiria in Portugal. In February 2020, however, he signed with FC Kolos Kovalivka in the Ukrainian Premier League.

References

External links

 

1999 births
Living people
Footballers from Kyiv
Ukraine under-21 international footballers
Ukrainian footballers
Association football goalkeepers
U.D. Leiria players
FC Kolos Kovalivka players
FC Podillya Khmelnytskyi players
Campeonato de Portugal (league) players
Ukrainian Premier League players
Ukrainian First League players
Ukrainian expatriate footballers
Ukrainian expatriate sportspeople in Portugal
Expatriate footballers in Portugal
Ukrainian expatriate sportspeople in Kazakhstan
Expatriate footballers in Kazakhstan